Mario Wuysang (born May 5, 1979) is a former Indonesian-American professional basketball player. Nicknamed "Uncle Roe," he went to college at Indiana University – Purdue University Fort Wayne. He is considered as Indonesia's best point guard of all time, known for his passing and 3-point shooting ability. He also represents Indonesia in international competitions, playing for the Indonesian national basketball team.

Career Statistics

Regular season 

*As of 2/14/2018

Playoffs

International

References

External links

1979 births
Living people
ASEAN Basketball League players
Indonesian men's basketball players
Purdue Fort Wayne Mastodons men's basketball players
Sportspeople from Surabaya
Point guards
Southeast Asian Games silver medalists for Indonesia
Southeast Asian Games bronze medalists for Indonesia
Southeast Asian Games medalists in basketball
Competitors at the 2007 Southeast Asian Games
Competitors at the 2011 Southeast Asian Games
Competitors at the 2015 Southeast Asian Games
Competitors at the 2017 Southeast Asian Games